This is a list of the NCAA outdoor champions in the 200 meters event.

Champions
Key
w=wind aided
A=Altitude assisted

References

GBR Athletics

External links
NCAA Division I women's outdoor track and field

NCAA Women's Division I Outdoor Track and Field Championships
Outdoor track, women
200 m